Phototropins are photoreceptor proteins (more specifically, flavoproteins) that mediate phototropism responses in various species of algae, fungi and higher plants. Phototropins can be found throughout the leaves of a plant. Along with cryptochromes and phytochromes they allow plants to respond and alter their growth in response to the light environment.  Phototropins may also be important for the opening of stomata and the movement of chloroplasts. These blue light receptors are seen across the entire green plant lineage. When Phototropins are hit with blue light, they induce a signal transduction pathway that alters the plant cells' functions in different ways.

Phototropins are part of the phototropic sensory system in plants that causes various environmental responses in plants.  Phototropins specifically will cause stems to bend towards light and stomata to open. Phototropins have been shown to impact the movement of chloroplast inside the cell. In addition phototropins mediate the first changes in stem elongation in blue light prior to cryptochrome activation. Phototropin  is also required for blue light mediated transcript destabilization of specific mRNAs in the cell. They are present in the guard cell.

References

Other sources 
 
 
 

Sensory receptors
Signal transduction
Biological pigments
Integral membrane proteins
Molecular biology
Plant physiology
EC 2.7.11